Gastrol is a phenolic compound produced by the saprophytic orchid Gastrodia elata.

References 

Phenols
Gastrodia